is a passenger railway station located in the Takebe-chō neighborhood of Kita-ku of the city of Okayama, Okayama Prefecture, Japan. It is operated by West Japan Railway Company (JR West).

Lines

Station layout
The station consists of one ground-level side platform and one grind-level island platform serving three tracks.  The wooden station building is located on the side of Platform 1, which is the side platform, and is connected to Platforms 2 and 3, which are on the island platform, via a footbridge. The island platform has a waiting room. The station is unattended.

Platforms

Adjacent stations

History
Fukuwatari Station opened on December 21, 1898 with the opening of the Tsuyama Line.  With the privatization of the Japan National Railways (JNR) on April 1, 1987, the station came under the aegis of the West Japan Railway Company.

Passenger statistics
In fiscal 2019, the station was used by an average of 267 passengers daily..

Surrounding area
Okayama City Kita Ward Office Takebe Branch (Former Takebe Town Office)
Okayama Takebe Medical Welfare College (former Okayama Prefectural Fukuwatari High School)

See also
List of railway stations in Japan

References

External links

 Fukuwatari Station Official Site

Railway stations in Okayama
Tsuyama Line
Railway stations in Japan opened in 1898